The Agusan Catholic Education Association (ACEA) is an association of Catholic schools and colleges under or may be run by the Roman Catholic Diocese of Butuan.

The current Diocesan School Board is the bishop of the Diocese of Butuan, Msgr. Juan de Dios M. Pueblos, DD and the Director of ACEA is Msgr. Bienvenido A. Betaizar, PC.

List of ACEA institutions

Agusan del Norte
 Father Saturnino Urios University
 Father Urios Institute of Technology - Ampayon, Butuan
 Sacred Heart School of Butuan - Butuan
 Sto. Niño Kindergarten - Libertad, Butuan
 Carmen Academy - Carmen, Agusan del Norte
 Saint Michael College of Caraga - Nasipit, Agusan del Norte
 Saint James High School - Buenavista, Agusan del Norte
 San Isidro Learning Center - Remedios T. Romualdez, Agusan del Norte
 Candelaria Institute - Cabadbaran
 Father Urios Academy of Magallanes, Inc. - Magallanes, Agusan del Norte
 Immaculate Heart of Mary Academy - Kitcharao, Agusan del Norte

Agusan del Sur
 Father Saturnino Urios College of Sibagat - Sibagat, Agusan del Sur
 Father Saturnino Urios College of Bayugan - Bayugan
 Father Urios High School - Properidad, Agusan del Sur
 Mt. Carmel College of San Francisco - San Francisco, Agusan del Sur
 Mt. Carmel High School - Rosario, Agusan del Sur
 Urios College of Trento - Trento, Agusan del Sur

Education in Agusan del Norte
Education in Agusan del Sur
Education in Butuan